Strengite is a relatively rare iron phosphate mineral with the formula: FePO4 · 2H2O. The mineral is named after the German mineralogist Johann August Streng (1830–1897). Lavender, pink or purple in hue, it is similar to variscite and is partially soluble, particularly in conditions where there is a low pH and low oxidation-reduction potential.  The color comes from ferric ion (Fe3+ )

References

Phosphate minerals
Orthorhombic minerals
Minerals in space group 61